The German Colony (HaMoshava HaGermanit) was established in Ottoman Haifa in 1868 as a Christian German Templer Colony in Palestine. It was the first of several colonies established by the group in the Holy Land. Others were founded in Sarona near Jaffa, Galilee and Jerusalem.

History

The Templers, a religious Protestant sect formed in southern Germany in the 19th century, settled in Palestine at the urging of their leader, Christoph Hoffmann, in the belief that living in the Holy Land would hasten the second coming of Christ. The Templers built a colony in keeping with strict urban planning principles and introduced local industries that brought modernity to Palestine, which had long been neglected by the Ottomans. They were the first to organize regular transportation services between Jaffa, Acre and Nazareth, which also allowed for mail delivery.

In 1874 the Christian denomination of the Temple Society underwent a schism and later envoys of the Evangelical State Church of Prussia's older Provinces successfully proselytised among the schismatics, making up about a third of the colonists. Thus the Colony became a place of partisans of two different Christian denominations and their respective congregations.

While in Germany the Templers were regarded as sectarians, the Evangelical proselytes gained major financial and mental support from German Lutheran and Evangelical church bodies. This created an atmosphere of mistrust and envy among the German colonists in Haifa. On July 17, 1886 the proselytes appealed to the Supreme Church Council of the State Church of Prussia's older Provinces to be accepted as and helped to found an Evangelical congregation. In 1891 the Jerusalemsverein, a Berlin-based Evangelical charitable organisation to subsidize Protestant activities in the Holy Land, decided to support the new Haifa congregation.

The Jerusalemsverein sent and sponsored a teacher for the congregants' children. In 1892 the Jerusalemsverein decided to lend the congregation the money needed to build a prayer hall. Otto Fischer (1813–1910), a Haifa resident, donated the land at the foot of Mount Carmel, and the Haifa engineer Ernst August Voigt gratuitously drew the constructions plans. In September 1892 the constructions started and pastor Carl Schlicht (Jerusalem) inaugurated the community centre, including a prayer hall and two school rooms, on July 2, 1893.   The community center and school buildings became the Haifa City Museum in 2011. Starting in the same year the Jerusalemsverein sponsored a pastor for the new Haifa Evangelical Congregation.

The teacher Herrmann initiated a choir. From 1900 on, Marie Teckhaus, a Deaconess sponsored by the Kaiserswerth Deaconesses Mother House, ran a medical station, open for patients of all denominations and religions. In 1907 the congregation built a separate school building, but later the discrepancies between the two German-speaking congregations – Evangelical and Templer – shrank, thus before World War I the schools were pooled.

The population fluctuated between 300-400 settlers between 1870 and 1914. Sixty of the colonists were American citizens and their leader, Jacob Schumacher served as the U.S. consular agent for Haifa and northern Palestine. Due to their population increase and the ongoing urbanisation of Haifa, the colonists searched to buy lands in order to found new settlements. These were to be exclusively monodenominational. Thus the Templers settled in Bethlehem of Galilee and the Evangelical Protestants founded the neighbouring Waldheim.

Employing modern farming methods, the Templers introduced soil fertilization, better methods of crop rotation and new crops such as potatoes. They imported agricultural machinery and engaged in "mixed farming," combining dairy farming and field crops.

Registering the land was problematic due to back taxes and local boundary disputes, which sometimes turned violent. The Templers thus abandoned farming in favor of industry and tourism. They built hotels, opened workshops and established an olive oil soap factory.

The affluent German colony stood out in its poor surroundings. The only doctor in the city lived there, and one of the residents was a construction engineer. By the end of the Ottoman era the colony had 750 inhabitants, 150 houses and dozens of businesses. The colony was the first model of urban planning in Palestine, with a main street running from north to south (today, Ben-Gurion Boulevard), leading down to the harbor. Smaller streets branched out from the main street. At the southern end of the colony were the Templer vineyards (where the Bahá'í World Centre stands today). The colony was built as a garden city with single-family homes surrounded by gardens and shade trees lining the main boulevard.

Nazi affiliation and expulsion
When in World War I General Allenby conquered Palestine from the Ottomans, the German colonists were regarded as enemy aliens. Many of the colonists were recruited for the units of the German Imperial Army, which fought together with the army of the Ottoman ally against the British conquest. The Britons entered Haifa and the colony only after the end of the fighting. Thus the colonists in Haifa were not deported to Egypt, as were the colonists of other, more southern colonies (Jaffa, Rephaim, Sarona, and Wilhelma), which happened to lie in the battle fields.

In 1937, 34% of the Templers were card-carrying members of the Nazi party. On King George VI's Coronation Day in 1937, all the Templer colonies flew the swastika flag. At the start of World War II colonists with German citizenship were rounded up by the British and sent, together with Italian and Hungarian enemy aliens, to internment camps in Waldheim and Bethlehem of Galilee. 661 Templers were deported to Australia via Egypt on July 31, 1941, leaving 345 in Palestine.

Restoration
Some of the old Templer homes have been restored in recent years. Buildings along Ben-Gurion Boulevard have been turned into cafés, boutiques, hotels, and restaurants, one houses the Haifa City Museum, and the colony has become a center of Haifa nightlife with pubs and bars being a common sight.

References

Bibliography
 Alex Carmel, Die Siedlungen der württembergischen Templer in Palästina (1868–1918) (11973), [התיישבות הגרמנים בארץ ישראל בשלהי השלטון הטורקי: בעיותיה המדיניות, המקומיות והבינלאומיות, ירושלים :חמו"ל, תש"ל; גרמנית], Stuttgart: Kohlhammer Verlag, 32000, (Veröffentlichungen der Kommission für geschichtliche Landeskunde in Baden-Württemberg: Reihe B, Forschungen; vol. 77). .
 Alex Carmel, Geschichte Haifas in der türkischen Zeit 1516-1918 [תולדות חיפה בימי התורכים, חיפה: הוצאת הספרים האקדמית של אוניברסיטת חיפה, 1969; גרמנית], Wiesbaden: Harrassowitz, 1975, (Abhandlungen des Deutschen Palästina-Vereins; vol. 3). 
 Ejal Jakob Eisler, "«Kirchler» im Heiligen Land: Die evangelischen Gemeinden in den württembergischen Siedlungen Palästinas (1886–1914)", In: Dem Erlöser der Welt zur Ehre: Festschrift zum hundertjährigen Jubiläum der Erlöserkirche in Jerusalem, Karl-Heinz Ronecker (ed.) on behalf of the 'Jerusalem-Stiftung' and 'Jerusalemsverein', Leipzig: Evangelische Verlags-Anstalt, 1998, pp. 81–100. .

External links

 Haifa Tourists Board: The German Colony - Historical Background
 Photo, circa 1898

Neighborhoods of Haifa
Tourist attractions in Haifa
Templer settlements
Populated places established in 1868
1868 establishments in Ottoman Syria

de:Tempelgesellschaft#Haifa